Waghi Tumbe is a semi-professional rugby league club based in Minj, Jiwaka Province of Papua New Guinea. They compete in the Digicel Cup, Papua New Guinea's semi-professional rugby league competition. the team first entered the SP cup now known as Digicel cup in the 2000s.

2022 squad

References

Papua New Guinean rugby league teams
Jiwaka Province